Logitech International S.A. (often shortened to Logi) is a Swiss multinational manufacturer of computer peripherals and software, with headquarters in Lausanne, Switzerland, and Newark, California. The company has offices throughout Europe, Asia, Oceania, and the Americas, and is one of the world's leading manufacturers of input and interface devices for personal computers (PCs) and other digital products. It is a component of the flagship Swiss Market Index.

The company develops and markets personal peripherals for PC navigation, video communication and collaboration, music and smart homes. This includes products like keyboards, mice, tablet accessories, headphones and headsets, webcams, Bluetooth speakers, universal remotes and more. Its name is derived from logiciel, the French word for software.

History 

Logitech was founded in Apples, Vaud, Switzerland, in 1981 by Stanford alumni Daniel Borel and Pierluigi Zappacosta, and former Olivetti engineer Giacomo Marini. For a time during its formative years, Logitech's Silicon Valley offices occupied space at 165 University Avenue, Palo Alto, California, home to a number of noted technology startups.

In 2001, Logitech acquired Labtec for $150 million in order to expand its range of computer peripherals.

In 2007, Logitech licensed Hillcrest Labs' Freespace motion control technology to produce the MX Air Mouse, which allows a user to use natural gestures to control a PC.

In August 2008, Logitech acquired Ultimate Ears, supplier of custom in-ear monitors for professional musicians and Bluetooth speakers for the consumer market.

In December 2008, Logitech announced that it had manufactured one billion mice since 1985.

In December 2009, Logitech acquired video conferencing equipment maker Lifesize Communications.

In July 2011, Logitech acquired the mobile visual communications provider Mirial.

In January 2013, Bracken Darrell became Logitech's chief executive officer; then-CEO Guerrino De Luca continued as Logitech's chairman of the board.

In January 2016, Logitech spun off the video conferencing equipment maker Lifesize.

In April 2016, Logitech agreed to pay  penalty related to accusations that it and some former executives improperly inflated the company's results for its 2011 fiscal year to meet guidance and other accounting violations. The U.S. Securities and Exchange Commission said the alleged accounting issues left investors without an accurate view of the Swiss company's finances.

On 25 March 2017, Logitech signed a multi-year sponsorship deal with McLaren as the Official Technology Peripherals Partner. The deal would later be extended to McLaren's eSports endeavours under the Logitech G brand in 2020. 

On 25 May 2018, Logitech acquired Beyond Entertainment, an esports live broadcasting and digital media company, for an undisclosed amount.

On 26 September 2019, Logitech acquired Streamlabs, producer of software and tools for live-streaming, for approximately $89 million. 

On 29 July 2021, Logitech, in collaboration with choreographer JaQuel Knight,  introduced its #Creators4BIPOC initiative under the Logitech For Creators brand. It allows social media creators, particularly BIPOC influencers, to copyright and monetize their online creations by making it possible for choreographers who amplify attention to hits by major artists in the entertainment business to secure copyright of their choreography using Labanotation and earn royalties from it.

Production 
The first Logitech mice, starting from the P4, were made in Le Lieu, in the Swiss Canton of Vaud by Dubois Dépraz SA.

Production facilities were then established in the United States, Taiwan, Hungary and Ireland before being moved to Suzhou, China. , the manufacturing operations in China produce approximately half of Logitech's products. The remaining production is outsourced to contract manufacturers and original design manufacturers in Asia.

Logitech product lines 

 Logitech – worldwide (except in Japan, where it is known as Logicool) for PC peripherals, remote controls, security cameras, mice, keyboards, webcams, computer speakers, and accessories for smartphones and tablet keyboards and covers
 Logitech video collaboration, including all B2B video conferencing equipment
 Logitech MX – flagship computer accessories (mice and keyboards)
 Logitech C – computer webcams (cameras)
 Logitech G – gaming products
 Ultimate Ears – in-ear monitors, wireless Bluetooth speakers and universal-fit earphones
 Jaybird – wireless bluetooth sport earbuds
 Slim Devices – audio brand
 Saitek – purchased on 15 September 2016, from Mad Catz
 Logitech Harmony – programmable remote controls
 Logitech F – wired and wireless gamepads

Gallery

References

External links

 

 
1980s initial public offerings
Audio equipment manufacturers of Switzerland
Companies based in Lausanne
Companies based in Newark, California
Companies listed on the SIX Swiss Exchange
Companies listed on the Nasdaq
Computer companies established in 1981
Computer peripheral companies
Electronics companies established in 1981
Electronics companies of Switzerland
Home automation companies
Loudspeaker manufacturers
Multinational companies headquartered in Switzerland
Swiss brands
Swiss companies established in 1981
Technology companies established in 1981
Technology companies of Switzerland